Sodom (known locally as Sudheim) is a settlement on Whalsay, Shetland. The name is a corruption of the Old Norse Suðheim meaning "south home". It was formerly the home of Hugh MacDiarmid, who was greatly amused at the anglicised form of the name.

Footnotes

External links
Scottish Places - Sudheim

Villages in Whalsay